Oluademilade Adejuyigbe, known professionally as Demi Adejuyigbe (born August 2, 1992), is a British-born American writer, comedian, and social media personality. He is best known for co-hosting the podcast Gilmore Guys, and his work on the NBC comedy series The Good Place and the CBS late night show The Late Late Show with James Corden. In 2018, he was named as one of Vulture magazine's "38 Comedians You Should and Will Know".

Early life and education
Adejuyigbe was born in London in 1992 to Nigerian parents and lived in the United Kingdom until he was five years old. His family then moved to Dallas, Texas where he lived until moving to Los Angeles, California in 2013. He has one younger sister named Temiloluwa. He attended high school in Texas and then attended the University of Texas at Austin, receiving a B.S. in Radio, Television, and Film in 2013.

Career

Beginnings and social media
Adejuyigbe initially gained notoriety from his online presence on Vine under the name "Electrolemon." After graduating from University of Texas, he moved to Los Angeles and began working as an office manager for FOX Animation Domination High Definition programming and then interned at Ben Stiller's Red Hour Productions. Adejuyigbe was hired as a Vine producer for the digital team at Funny or Die and later became a digital producer for @midnight in 2014. He hosted Points Party, a spin-off talk show of @midnight that was posted exclusively on Snapchat.

Adejuyigbe has gained recognition for his comedy music clips, which he posts to Twitter and YouTube. These include parody raps in the style of Will Smith and an annual video of him dancing to the song "September" by Earth, Wind & Fire uploaded on September 21, the date mentioned in the song. In 2018 he sold T-shirts identical to the one he wears in each video, with all of the proceeds (over $17,000) going to RAINN, RAICES, and the National Center for Transgender Equality. In 2020 he used the video as a charity fundraiser, raising over $300,000 to be split between several community organizations. In 2021, he retired the series with a final video that included him dancing on the ceiling like Fred Astaire and later Lionel Richie, and included thanks from members of Earth, Wind & Fire at the end. In one day, his fundraiser raised over $800,000 for Imagine Waterworks, the West Fund, and the Sunrise Movement. In 2022 he released a theme tune for Stuart Little in the style of Lana Del Rey with vocals by Natalie Walker, benefiting New York Abortion Access Fund.

He is also a member of the Democratic Socialists of America and helped canvass for Nithya Raman during the 2020 Los Angeles election.

Writing
Adejuyigbe joined the writers' room for the first season of NBC's The Good Place and was credited on the season's tenth episode, "Chidi's Choice." Until the summer of 2019, he worked as a writer for CBS' The Late Late Show with James Corden. In 2020 he wrote for The Amber Ruffin Show.

Adejuyigbe has also written articles for various publications including The New Yorker, The Guardian, Thought Catalog, CollegeHumor, and The Hairpin.

Podcasts
Adejuyigbe co-hosted the Gilmore Guys podcast from 2014 to 2017, in which he and Kevin T. Porter discussed every episode of the television series Gilmore Girls. He became involved with the podcast after Porter, whom he had taken improv classes with at Upright Citizens Brigade, sought guests and co-hosts for the podcast on Twitter and Adejuyigbe responded to the inquiry. By November 2016, they were getting between 150,000 and 200,000 downloads per episode. In 2017, Time magazine included Gilmore Guys in their list of "The 50 Best Podcasts Right Now." Adejuyigbe and Porter held live shows of their podcast across the country and had a cameo appearance in the revival of the series, Gilmore Girls: A Year in the Life.

Adejuyigbe co-hosted the podcast Punch Up the Jam for 86 episodes, from its 2017 inception until late 2019. His co-host was actor, singer, and Vine star Miel Bredouw. In the show, they discussed and then created parodies ("punch-ups") of well-known songs. In June 2019, Adejuyigbe announced his departure from Punch Up the Jam in a tweet made up of images that referenced famous album covers: Fiona Apple's When the Pawn..., The Black Keys' Brothers, Kanye West's The Life of Pablo, and Radiohead's In Rainbows. "I've had a wonderful run, but it's my time to move on," he said. "My last episodes will be dropping in September." Bredouw continued the podcast as its stand-alone host, reformatting the show slightly to allow for discussed songs to be "unpunchable" and including contributions from yMusic's Rob Moose. Adejuyigbe returned to the podcast as a guest in November 2020, for an episode centred on the Weezer track "Beverly Hills."

As a guest, Adejuyigbe has also appeared on podcasts such as Comedy Bang Bang, Blank Check with Griffin & David, Maximum Film!, Home Cooking and U Talkin' Talking Heads 2 My Talking Head.

Credits

Writer

Actor

Podcasts

Awards and nominations

References

External links
 
 
 Demi Adejuyigbe on Letterboxd

1992 births
21st-century American comedians
21st-century American male writers
21st-century American screenwriters
American Internet celebrities
American male comedians
American male television writers
American people of Nigerian descent
American television writers
Comedians from Texas
Headgum
Living people
Members of the Democratic Socialists of America
Moody College of Communication alumni
People from London
Screenwriters from Texas
University of Texas at Austin alumni
Vine (service) celebrities
YouTubers from Texas
American podcasters